The 1978–79 Iraqi National Clubs First Division was the 5th season of the competition since its foundation in 1974. Al-Zawraa won their third league title in four seasons, doing so without losing a game, and also won the 1978–79 Iraq FA Cup to secure the double for the second time.

Name changes 
 Al-Iktisad renamed to Al-Tijara.
 Al-Jamiea merged with Al-Talaba.

League table

Results

Season statistics

Top scorers

Hat-tricks

References

External links
 Iraq Football Association

Iraqi Premier League seasons
Iraq
1